Kattike Deurali is a village development committee in Kavrepalanchok District in the Bagmati Zone of central Nepal. At the time of the 1991 Nepal census, it had a population of 3,214 in 533 individual households.

References

External links
UN map of the municipalities of Kavrepalanchowk District

Populated places in Kavrepalanchok District